Roger Pilkington (c. 1325–1407) was an English soldier and politician. He served under Henry, Duke of Lancaster, and later under John of Gaunt in Aquitaine.

He was a Member (MP) of the Parliament of England for Lancashire in 1363 and subsequently.

References

1407 deaths
English MPs 1363
Year of birth uncertain
Members of the Parliament of England (pre-1707) for Lancashire